Jana Novotná and Helena Suková successfully defended their title, defeating Kathy Jordan and Elizabeth Smylie in the final, 6–3, 6–4 to win the ladies' doubles tennis title at the 1990 Wimbledon Championships.

Seeds

  Jana Novotná /  Helena Suková (champions)
  Gigi Fernández /  Martina Navratilova (quarterfinals)
  Larisa Savchenko /  Natasha Zvereva (semifinals)
 n/a
  Nicole Provis /  Elna Reinach (third round)
  Kathy Jordan /  Elizabeth Smylie (final)
  Mercedes Paz /  Arantxa Sánchez Vicario (quarterfinals)
  Steffi Graf /  Gabriela Sabatini (quarterfinals)
  Katrina Adams /  Lori McNeil (third round)
  Patty Fendick /  Zina Garrison (semifinals)
  Elise Burgin /  Rosalyn Fairbank (third round)
  Jill Hetherington /  Robin White (quarterfinals)
  Anne Smith /  Wendy Turnbull (third round)
  Natalia Medvedeva /  Leila Meskhi (second round)
  Mary-Lou Daniels /  Wendy Prausa (third round)
  Lise Gregory /  Gretchen Magers (third round)

Qualifying

Draw

Finals

Top half

Section 1

Section 2

Bottom half

Section 3

Section 4

References

External links

1990 Wimbledon Championships – Women's draws and results at the International Tennis Federation

Women's Doubles
Wimbledon Championship by year – Women's doubles
Wimbledon Championships